Henri Lopes (born 12 September 1937) is a Congolese writer, diplomat, and political figure. He was Prime Minister of Congo-Brazzaville from 1973 to 1975, and became the Congo-Brazzaville's Ambassador to France in 1998.

Political and diplomatic career
Lopes was born across the Congo River in Leopoldville (now Kinshasa), the capital of the Belgian Congo (now the Democratic Republic of the Congo). He received his primary education in Brazzaville and Bangui, then went to France in 1949 for his secondary and higher education. While there, he was a member of the Executive Committee of the Federation of Black African Students and was President of the Association of Congolese Students from 1957 to 1965. Returning to Congo in 1965, he was a history professor at the Ecole normale supérieure d'Afrique Centrale in Brazzaville from 1965 to 1966, then Director-General of Education from 1966 to 1968.

Under President Marien Ngouabi, Lopes was Minister of National Education from January 1969 until becoming Minister of Foreign Affairs in December 1971. He was included on the five-member Political Bureau of the Congolese Labour Party (PCT) in December 1972. Subsequently, he was Prime Minister from 1973 to 1975. He visited China in early 1975, but could not meet with Chairman Mao Zedong because Mao was ill. Lopes and his government resigned following a meeting of the PCT Central Committee in December 1975, and Louis Sylvain Goma was appointed to replace him.

After working as political director of Etumba from 1975 to 1977, Lopes was reappointed to the government as minister of finance on 5 April 1977; he served in that position until Justin Lekoundzou was appointed to replace him in December 1980. Subsequently, he worked at UNESCO as Assistant Director-General for Culture and Deputy Director-General for Africa from 1981 to 1998.

On 26 October 1998, Lopes presented his credentials as Congo-Brazzaville's Ambassador to France; while posted in Paris, he was additionally accredited as Ambassador to the United Kingdom, Portugal, Spain, and the Vatican City.

In 2002, Lopes was a candidate for the post of Secretary-General of the international organization La Francophonie, but he withdrew his candidacy under pressure on the night before the vote, which was held on 20 October 2002 and resulted in the unanimous election of Senegal's Abdou Diouf.

In mid-2015, it was reported that Lopes planned to retire from his post as Ambassador to France, which he did later that year.

As a writer
In addition to his distinguished political and diplomatic career, Lopes has earned distinction as a literary author. Perhaps his most acclaimed work is the satirical novel Le Pleurer-rire ("The Laughing Cry", 1982). Other works include the short-story collection Tribaliques ("Tribaliks," 1971), as well as the novels La Nouvelle romance (1975) and Sans tam-tam (1977). His most recent novel, Le Méridional (2015), has been praised as "a fine portrayal of the life of an African long residing in France, narrated by a writer whose life bears some resemblances to Lopes's own".

Tribaliques received the Grand Prix Littéraire de l'afrique noire in 1972, and in 1993 Lopes received the Grand prix de la francophonie of the Académie française for his entire body of work.

In November 2015, he delivered the keynote address at the 22nd International African Writers' Day Conference, organized by the Pan African Writers' Association (PAWA) on the theme "Celebrating the life and works of Chinua Achebe; the coming of age of African Literature?", in Accra, Ghana. During the conference Lopes received the award of Honorary Membership of PAWA, alongside other honorees who included the late Kwame Nkrumah, Emeritus Professor Ekwueme Michael Thelwell, Dr Margaret Busby, James Currey, Professor Jophus Anamuah-Mensah, Dr Joyce Rosalind Aryee and others.

Selected bibliography
 Le Méridional (Editions Gallimard, 2015)
 Une enfant de Poto-Poto (Editions Gallimard, 2012)
 Ma grand-mère bantoue et mes ancêtres les Gaulois. Simples discours (Paris: Editions Gallimard)
 Le Lys et le Flamboyant (Paris: Seuil, 1997)
 Le chercheur d’Afriques (Paris: Seuil, 1990)
 Le Pleurer-rire (Présence Africaine, 1982). Translated into English by G. Moore as The Laughing Cry: An African Cock and Bull Story, Readers International, 1987, 
 Sans tam-tam (Éditions CLE, 1977)
 La Nouvelle romance (Yaoundé: CLE, 1975)
 Tribaliques (Yaoundé: CLE, 1971). Translated into English as Tribaliks: Contemporary Congolese Stories (Heinemann African Writers Series, 1987)

Selected awards
 1972: Grand Prix Littéraire de l'afrique noire for Tribaliques
 1992: Grand prix de la francophonie
 2002: Honorary doctorates from University of Paris XII and the University of Quebec
 2013: Honorary doctorate from University of Sonfoniah, Guinea
 2015: Officer of the Légion d'Honneur

Further reading
 Bokiba, André-Patient (2003). Henri Lopes: Une lecture d'enracinement et d'universalité. Editions L'Harmattan. 
 Chemain, Arlette (1988). "Henri Lopes: engagement civique et recherche d’une écriture". Notre librairie, 92-93:123-128.
 Maunick, Edouard (1988). "Le territorre d'Henri Lopes". Notre librairie, 92-93:128-131.
 Mwepu, P. K. (December 2007). "From self-identity to universality: a reading of Henri Lopes’ works", Literator 28(3):131-144. ISSN 0258-2279

References

External links
 Lydie Moudileno, "Henri Lopes – 'La critique n'est pas une agression'" (interview), Genesis, 33, 2011, 93–100.
 Olivia Marsaud, "‘What I have learned’ from Henri Lopes", Afrique Magazine, May 2015.

 

|-

1937 births
People from Kinshasa
Ambassadors of the Republic of the Congo to France
Ambassadors of the Republic of the Congo to the Holy See
Ambassadors of the Republic of the Congo to Portugal
Ambassadors of the Republic of the Congo to Spain
Ambassadors of the Republic of the Congo to the United Kingdom
Congolese Party of Labour politicians
Living people
Prime Ministers of the Republic of the Congo
Foreign Ministers of the Republic of the Congo
Finance ministers of the Republic of the Congo
Republic of the Congo writers
20th-century male writers
21st-century male writers